Ice Age is an American media franchise centering on a group of mammals surviving the Pleistocene ice age. It consists of computer-animated films, short films, TV specials and a series of video games. The first five films were produced by Blue Sky Studios. The series features the voices of Ray Romano, John Leguizamo, Denis Leary and Chris Wedge, who were the only constant cast members for the original films. Five theatrical films have been released in the series thus far: Ice Age in 2002, Ice Age: The Meltdown in 2006, Ice Age: Dawn of the Dinosaurs in 2009, Ice Age: Continental Drift in 2012, and Ice Age: Collision Course in 2016. As of April 2016, the franchise had generated $6 billion in revenue, making it one of the highest-grossing media franchises of all time.

A standalone spin-off film, The Ice Age Adventures of Buck Wild, was released exclusively on Disney+ on January 28, 2022 without Blue Sky's involvement. Simon Pegg was the only returning actor.

Films

Main series

Ice Age (2002)

Sid, a goofy but good-natured sloth, is left behind by his family and the herds of mammals journeying to the south. He meets Manny, a cynical and loner woolly mammoth who is travelling to the north, and decides to follow him, much to Manny's disdain. Along the way, the pair come across a woman who has jumped down the nearby waterfall in a desperate bid to protect her child after their camp was attacked by saber-toothed tigers. She silently pushes the infant towards Manny and Sid before disappearing into the water. The two animals decide to search for the father and return the baby to him. However, the villainous Soto, leader of the sabers, instructs his second in command, Diego, to bring the baby to him so he can exact his revenge on the child's father, who frequently kills sabers with his tribe for their furs and meat. Diego comes across Manny and Sid and, since they refuse to just give him the child, he pretends to lead them towards the baby's tribe, when really Soto and the rest of the pack wait in an icy mountain range to ambush them, intending on killing Manny and stealing the child. During their journey however, the trio bond over the infant and Diego must ultimately decide where his loyalties lie.

Ice Age: The Meltdown (2006)

Manny, Sid, and Diego are currently living in a large valley surrounded by an enormously high ice wall on all sides. However, the trio discovers that the ice wall is actually a wall that is barely holding a massive body of water that could flood the valley to nearly a mile underwater. A vulture tells them that there is a boat at the other end of the valley that may save them all, but they only have three days to reach it or die. Manny is also having trouble fearing the fact that he may be the last mammoth left. Along the way, they meet Ellie, a bubbly female mammoth who thinks she is a possum, and her possum brothers Crash and Eddie. As they begin to travel together, Manny learns, with help from Diego and Sid, that he must move on from his past and open his heart to change. During their journey, Scrat, a sabre-toothed squirrel, has his own adventure.

Ice Age: Dawn of the Dinosaurs (2009)

Manny and Ellie are happily married and expecting their first child. Scrat falls in love with fellow squirrel Scratte. Diego is anxious about how things will change after Manny becomes a father and considers leaving the Herd. Sid begins to wish for a family of his own, and steals some dinosaur eggs but after the dino mother comes back for her stolen eggs and takes the talkative sloth home with her, the herd must travel to an colourful underground world to rescue him. During the adventure, Manny and the gang meet Buck, an insane one-eyed weasel who aids them on their quest.

Ice Age: Continental Drift (2012)

Taking place sixteen years after the events of the third film, Manny's overprotective nature causes a rift between him and his teenage daughter, Peaches. Scrat's pursuit of acorns has world-changing consequences, separating Manny, Sid, Diego and Sid's cantankerous Granny from the rest of their group. Things take a dangerous turn for the worst when the gang come into conflict with a rag-tag pirate crew led by the sadistic Captain Gutt. As the friends embark on an epic adventure in their desperate bid to return home, Diego grapples with his conflicting feelings for Gutt's feisty first mate, Shira, and Manny struggles to accept his daughter may be growing up.

Ice Age: Collision Course (2016)

Five years after the events of the fourth film Manny and Ellie are planning the upcoming wedding between their daughter, Peaches and the clumsy but sweet Julian. Manny is reluctant to let his daughter marry Julian as he thinks he is a bit of a goof but Peaches urges her father to get to know him. Scrat's pursuit of his elusive acorn catapults him outside of Earth aboard a UFO, where he accidentally sets off a series of intergalactic events that transform and threaten the planet. To save themselves from peril, Manny, Sid, Diego, and the rest of the gang leave their home and reunite with the adventurous Buck, who leads them on a crazy cosmic journey to find a way to save the planet.

Untitled sixth film (TBA)
While promoting The Ice Age Adventures of Buck Wild, the Disney+ PR page revealed that another Ice Age film is in development. Ray DeLaurentis is penning the script. However, it is currently unknown if the film will be the sixth Ice Age film or a spin-off film from the film series like The Ice Age Adventures of Buck Wild.

Spin-off film

The Ice Age Adventures of Buck Wild (2022)

On the possibility of a potential sixth film in the franchise, in June 2016, Galen T. Chu, co-director of the film, stated that there were some ideas for the next installment. In August 2018, CEO of 20th Century Fox Stacey Snider announced that a television series based on Ice Age and centered around the character Buck is in development. On October 25, 2019, after the acquisition of 21st Century Fox by Disney, the project was confirmed to be still in development for Disney+. In December 2020, the project was confirmed to have been redeveloped as a film and to be titled Ice Age: Adventures of Buck Wild, centering around Buck going on an adventure in the Dinosaur World with Crash and Eddie. The film released on January 28, 2022 and features Simon Pegg reprising his role as the title character. All of the other main characters are voiced by different actors. Batu Sener composed the film's score. Unlike the previous Ice Age films released by 20th Century Fox and produced by 20th Century Fox Animation and Blue Sky, the film was produced by Walt Disney Pictures, with the animation being outsourced to Bardel Entertainment. Manny, Ellie, Sid, and Diego appear in the film as supporting characters. Characters including Scrat, Peaches, Julian, Shira, and Brooke are absent.

Short films

Gone Nutty

Gone Nutty is a 2002 animated short film directed by Carlos Saldanha. It originally released on the Ice Age DVD. The short features Scrat, who is yet again having troubles with collecting his beloved acorns. The film was nominated for the 2003 Academy Award for Animated Short Film.

No Time for Nuts

No Time for Nuts is a 2006 animated short film directed by Chris Renaud and Michael Thurmeier. It was originally released on the Ice Age: The Meltdown DVD. The short follows Scrat on a chase after his nut, which has been accidentally sent back in time by a frozen time machine. No Time for Nuts was nominated for the 2007 Academy Award for Best Animated Short Film.

Surviving Sid

Surviving Sid is a 2008 animated short film directed by Galen Tan Chu and Karen Disher. It was originally released on the Horton Hears a Who! DVD and Blu-ray. Unlike the first two Ice Age short films, Surviving Sid focuses on Sid, who incompetently "leads" a small group of camping children.

Scrat's Continental Crack-Up
Scrat's Continental Crack-Up is the first of a 2012 two-part animated short film directed by Steve Martino and Michael Thurmeier. It was originally released in theaters alongside Gulliver's Travels and Rio.

Scrat's Continental Crack-Up - Part 2
Scrat's Continental Crack-Up: Part 2 is the second of a 2012 two-part animated short film directed by Steve Martino and Michael Thurmeier. It was originally released in theaters alongside Alvin and the Chipmunks: Chipwrecked.

Cosmic Scrat-tastrophe

Cosmic Scrat-tastrophe is a 2015 animated short film directed by Michael Thurmeier. It was originally released in theaters alongside The Peanuts Movie. The short once again follows Scrat, who discovers a flying saucer frozen in a block of ice and accidentally powers it on and ends up creating the Solar System through a series of mishaps.

Scrat: Spaced Out

Scrat: Spaced Out is a 2016 animated short film directed by Michael Thurmeier. It was originally released on the Ice Age: Collision Course DVD and Blu-ray. The short once again follows Scrat, trying to get back to Earth after the events in Cosmic Scrat-tastrophe.

The End
On April 13, 2022, some group of animators including Wedge from Blue Sky released a 35 second long short film in which Scrat finally got his acorn as a goodbye to the franchise from Blue Sky Studios.

Television specials

Ice Age: A Mammoth Christmas

In the middle of decorating for the holiday season, Sid accidentally destroys Manny's favourite decorations. Sid, convinced by Manny that he is now on Santa's naughty list, takes off with Crash, Eddie and Peaches for the North Pole to get back on the Santa's good side. When on the North Pole, Sid and his crew accidentally destroy Santa's Workshop. When Manny, Ellie and Diego, worried over Peaches's safety, arrive at the North Pole, they must come together and save Christmas.

Ice Age: The Great Egg-Scapade

The special centers on a harried prehistoric bird mom who entrusts her precious, soon-to-hatch egg to Sid. When she recommends him to her neighbors—a condor mother, Cholly Bear and Gladys Glypto—business booms at his new egg-sitting service.

However, dastardly pirate bunny Squint, who is seeking revenge on the herd, steals, camouflages and hides all the eggs. Once again, with Squint's twin brother, Clint, assisting, Manny, Diego and the rest of the gang come to the rescue and take off on a daring mission that turns into the world's first Easter egg hunt.

Ice Age: Scrat Tales

On May 4, 2021, it was rumored that a short series produced by Blue Sky Studios known as Scrat Tales would be coming to Disney+. The series would follow the titular Scrat, who discovers that he has a son. Footage of the series was later leaked onto YouTube, with former Blue Sky animators revealing that the series would be coming to Disney+ in 2022 after The Ice Age Adventures of Buck Wild. A plush for the character of Scrat's son was also unveiled via Just Play Products’ website, with the second image featuring a blue tag containing the logo for Scrat Tales, although the listing was retitled under The Ice Age Adventures of Buck Wild to promote the new film.

The series was released as a Disney+ original series on April 13, 2022. The soundtrack album for the show was released on March 25, 2022 by Hollywood Records.  Music for the series is composed by Batu Sener and End Titles music is provided by John Powell.

Cast

 A dark gray cell indicates the character was not featured in the film.
 A  indicates a performance through previously recorded material.

Note: A dark grey cell indicates character did not appear in that medium.

Crew

Reception

Box office performance
All five films, produced on a total budget of $429 million, have grossed over $3.2 billion worldwide, making Ice Age the 18th highest-grossing franchise of all time, and the third highest-grossing animated franchise worldwide behind Despicable Me and Shrek. The first four films were the highest-grossing animated films in each year they were released, and among the eight highest-grossing films in their respective release years. However, the fifth film was considered a commercial disappointment and is the lowest-grossing film in both the franchise and Blue Sky's filmography (when adjusted for inflation).

Critical and public response
While the first film received generally positive reviews, the series has received some criticism for making no attempt to be scientifically accurate and has experienced a steadily declining critical reception with each succeeding film.

Video games
 Ice Age was released in 2002 by Ubisoft for Game Boy Advance.
 Ice Age 2: The Meltdown was released in 2006 by Vivendi Universal Games for Wii, PlayStation 2, GameCube, Game Boy Advance, Nintendo DS, Xbox, and Microsoft Windows.
 Ice Age: Dawn of the Dinosaurs was released by Activision on June 30, 2009, for Microsoft Windows, Wii, DS, PlayStation 2, PlayStation 3, and Xbox 360.
 Ice Age 3: Boulder Drop was an online game released in 2009.
 Ice Age 3: Dino Dinner was an online game released in 2009.
 Ice Age 3: Slippery Slope was an online game released in 2009.
 Ice Age Village was a mobile video game released by Gameloft on April 5, 2012, for iOS and Android devices, and on April 24, 2013, for Windows Phone. The game allows players to build a village while characters from the films set them goals. Player's can also visit their friend's villages, play mini games and watch videos.
 Ice Age: Continental Drift – Arctic Games was released by Activision on July 10, 2012, to Wii, Nintendo 3DS, Nintendo DS, and Xbox 360.
 Ice Age Online was a free-to-play browser game developed by Bigpoint Games for its gaming portal. Beta version of the game was launched on July 10, 2012, which put players in the role of Sid, who has to rescue lost members of his herd, separated by a volcanic eruption.
 Ice Age: Clueless Ice Sloth was an online game released in 2012.
 Ice Age Adventures was a game released by Gameloft on August 7, 2014, for iOS, Android, Windows Phone, and Windows 8.
 Ice Age: Avalanche was a mobile match-3 game released by Gameloft released in 2015.
 Ice Age: Arctic Blast (originally titled Ice Age: Hailstorm) was a mobile match-3 game released by Zynga and featuring content from all first five films released in June 2016 for iOS and Android devices.
 Ice Age Mission Control was an online game released in 2016.
 Ice Age: Manic Meteor Run! was an online game released in 2016.
 Ice Age: Geode Jam! was an online game released in 2016.
 Ice Age: Coloring Book was an online game released in 2016.
 Ice Age: Matching Cards was an online game released in 2016.
 Ice Age: Scrat's Nutty Adventure was released by Outright Games in 2019 for PlayStation 4, Xbox One, Nintendo Switch, and Microsoft Windows.

Live show
Ice Age Live! A Mammoth Adventure is a live arena ice show that combines ice skating, aerial arts, puppetry and film, and tells a new story based on the first three Ice Age films. The plot begins with baby mammoth Peaches being kidnapped by an evil hawk-like creature called Shadow. Her father Manny sets off to rescue Peaches, accompanied by Sid and Diego. Their mission is successful, but on the way home they encounter avalanches and rockfalls, diverting them into a fantasy underground kingdom.

It is being produced by Stage Entertainment Touring Productions, and directed by Guy Caron and Michael Curry. The music and lyrics were written by Ella Louise Allaire and Martin Lord Ferguson. With the preview shows from October 19 to 21, 2012, in Cardiff, and from October 25 to 28, 2012, in Nottingham, A Mammoth Adventure officially premiered on November 2, 2012, during its three-day tour from November 1 to 3 at Wembley Arena in London. It continued in Germany in November 2012, with a plan to visit more than 30 countries in its five-year worldwide tour. In August 2016, Ice Age Live! A Mammoth Adventure concluded its world tour and was replaced in North America by Ice Age On Ice.

Themed Park
Ice Age inspired rides and attractions first opened at Movie Park German. In 2012, new Ice Age 4D experience open at Alton Towers. Then in 2014, new Ice Age rides open at Dufan Ancol, Jakarta that brings 2 Ice Age themed rides named Ice Age: Sid's Arctic Tours and Kontiki. Then later in 2021 the new Ice Age atrractions will be featured at the first 20th Century Fox theme park, called 20th Century Fox World, to open in 2021 as part of Malaysia-based Resorts World Genting.

References

External links

 

 
Animated film series
Film series introduced in 2002
20th Century Studios franchises
Boom! Studios titles
Film franchises
Children's film series